Sir Westby Brook Perceval  (11 May 1854 – 23 June 1928) was a New Zealand politician of the Liberal Party.

Biography

Perceval was born in Launceston, Tasmania in 1854. His mother was Sarah Brook (née Bailey) and his father was her husband, Westby Hawkshaw Percival, an Irish member of the mounted police in Melbourne. He received his early education at Merton's school, where he became friends with William Pember Reeves. In 1867 he won a junior Somes scholarship to Christ's College, Christchurch. At the age of 16, in May 1870, he was received into the Catholic church. He completed his secondary education at Stonyhurst College in England. In 1872, he inherited sufficient land upon his father's death that he had a secure income.

Perceval was a lawyer in Christchurch. He represented the Christchurch South electorate from the 1887 general election to the end of the parliamentary term in 1890, and then the City of Christchurch electorate from the 1890 general election to September 1891, when he resigned. For the last three months in Parliament, he was Chairman of Committees.

He was made Agent-General to the United Kingdom from 1891 to 1896, and then Agent-General for Tasmania from 1896 to 1898.

Perceval was appointed a Knight Commander of the Order of St Michael and St George (KCMG) in the 1894 New Year Honours. He died in Surrey, England, in 1928.

Family
Perceval married Jessie Johnston, daughter of John Johnston, in 1880. They had two sons:

Francis Westby Perceval (born 1882), barrister. He married in 1912 Dorothy Anne Cecilia Thornton.
Major-General Christopher Peter Westby Perceval (born 1890), Royal Artillery.

Notes

References

|-

|-

|-

1854 births
1928 deaths
New Zealand Roman Catholics
New Zealand Liberal Party MPs
19th-century New Zealand lawyers
Australian emigrants to New Zealand
People educated at Christ's College, Christchurch
People educated at Stonyhurst College
People from Christchurch
New Zealand MPs for Christchurch electorates
Independent MPs of New Zealand
High Commissioners of New Zealand to the United Kingdom
Members of the New Zealand House of Representatives
Politicians from Launceston, Tasmania
New Zealand Knights Commander of the Order of St Michael and St George
19th-century New Zealand politicians
New Zealand politicians awarded knighthoods
Johnston family